The team event was a figure skating competition of the 2018 Winter Olympics that was held from 9 to 12 February 2018 at the Gangneung Ice Arena in Gangneung, South Korea. It took place over three days between 9–12 February with the short programs and the short dance taking place on 9 and 11 February, and the free skates and the free dance taking place on 11 and 12 February.

Timeline 
All times are (UTC+9).

Records 

For a complete list of figure skating records, see list of highest scores in figure skating.

The following new best score was set during this competition:

This record was shortly broken in the 2018 Winter Olympics Ladies's Short Program by Alina Zagitova with a score of 82.92. Medvedeva broke her own record with a score of 81.61, before Zagitova scored higher after skating next.

Qualification 

A total of 10 teams qualified to compete. Each nation must have qualified in three of the four events to be considered for the team event. All athletes must have qualified for one of the other four events. However, if a nation did not qualify in one of the other four events, it was awarded an additional quota only for the team event. This was only used for Israel in the women's event.

Entries 
Member nations submitted the following entries:

Results

Short programs/dance

Men 
The men's short program was held on 9 February 2018.

Pairs 
The pairs short program was held on 9 February 2018.

Ice dance 
The ice dance short dance was held on 11 February 2018.

Ladies 
The women's short program was held on 11 February 2018.

Free skates/dance

Pairs 
The pairs free skate was held on 11 February 2018.

Men 
The men's free skate was held on 12 February 2018.

Ladies 
The women's free skate was held on 12 February 2018.

Ice dance 
The ice dance free dance was held on 12 February 2018.

Overall

Team overall 
After all events.

Ties are broken by taking the best team scores from two different disciplines.  If still tied then the total scores from those two disciplines are added together.

References

Citations 

Team event
Mixed events at the 2018 Winter Olympics
2018 in figure skating